Salome Receives the Head of John the Baptist is an oil on canvas painting by Dutch artist Matthias Stom, probably painted around 1630–1632 in Rome. It is now held in the National Gallery, in London, to which it was presented by the Trustees of Sir Denis Mahon's Charitable Trust via the Art Fund in 2013.

References

Paintings depicting Salome
Paintings depicting John the Baptist
Paintings by Matthias Stom
Collections of the National Gallery, London